János Dzvonyár (born 28 March 1961) is a Hungarian swimmer. He competed in three events at the 1980 Summer Olympics.

References

1961 births
Living people
Hungarian male swimmers
Olympic swimmers of Hungary
Swimmers at the 1980 Summer Olympics
Sportspeople from Debrecen